The 45th Filmfare Awards were held on 13 February 2000, in Mumbai, India. 

Hum Dil De Chuke Sanam led the ceremony with 17 nominations, followed by Taal with 12 nominations and Sarfarosh with 11 nominations. 

Hum Dil De Chuke Sanam won 8 awards including Best Film, Best Director (for Sanjay Leela Bhansali) and Best Actress (for Aishwarya Rai), thus becoming the most-awarded film at the ceremony. 

Sanjay Dutt won his first and only Best Actor award for his powerhouse performance in Vaastav: The Reality.

Aishwarya Rai received dual nominations for Best Actress for her performances in Hum Dil De Chuke Sanam and Taal, winning for the former.

Sushmita sen received dual nominations for Best Supporting Actress for her performances in Biwi No.1 and Sirf Tum, winning for the former. 

The ceremony also proved to be notable since both Rai (Best Actress winner) and Sen (Best Supporting Actress winner) were aso former pageant winners for Miss World 1994 and Miss Universe 1994 respectively.

Awards 

The winners and nominees have been listed below. Winners are listed first, highlighted in boldface, and indicated with a double dagger.

Popular Awards

Technical Awards

Critics' Awards

Special Awards

Superlatives

References

External links
45th Filmfare Awards at Filmfare Indiatimes
 https://www.imdb.com/event/ev0000245/2000/

Filmfare Awards
Filmfare